Lieutenant Leonard Monteagle Barlow MC & Two Bars (5 June 1898 – 5 February 1918) was a British World War I flying ace. He was born in Islington, London and studied electrical engineering prior to joining the Royal Flying Corps.

Barlow was posted to No. 56 Squadron and scored 20 victories whilst serving with the squadron, being awarded the Military Cross three times for his outstanding airmanship and bravery.

Dubbed 'The Gadget King', due to his inventiveness, Barlow developed an ingenious way of firing both of his SE5a aircraft's machine guns at the same time. On 25 September he claimed 3 Albatros fighters of Jasta 10, Lt. Weigand and Uzz. Werkmeister being killed and one other pilot wounded.

On 5 February 1918, Barlow was killed at Martlesham Heath whilst test flying a Sopwith Dolphin which broke up in mid air.

His final tally consisted of 12 and 1 shared destroyed, 6 and 1 shared 'out of control'.

He is buried at Bandon Hill Cemetery, Plot F.85

Honours and awards

25 August 1917 - 2nd Lieutenant Leonard Monteagle Barlow, MC, RFC, Special Reserve is awarded the Military Cross:

16 October 1917 - 2nd Lieutenant Leonard Monteagle Barlow, MC, RFC, Special Reserve is awarded a bar to the Military Cross:
 

27 October 1917 - Lieutenant Leonard Monteagle Barlow, MC, RFC, Special Reserve Canadian Force is awarded a second bar the Military Cross.

External links
Leonard Monteagle Barlow

References

1898 births
1918 deaths
People from Islington (district)
Royal Flying Corps officers
British World War I flying aces
British Army personnel of World War I
Aviators killed in aviation accidents or incidents in England
Recipients of the Military Cross